Anne Davies Rieley (December 21, 1930 – February 25, 1995) was an American figure skater who competed in both ice dance and pairs with partner Carleton Hoffner.  They won the dance title at the 1946 U.S. Figure Skating Championships and won the bronze medal in pairs at the 1949 World Figure Skating Championships.

Results
(Pairs with Hoffner)

(Ice Dance with Hoffner)

References

1930 births
1995 deaths
American female ice dancers
American female pair skaters
World Figure Skating Championships medalists
20th-century American women
20th-century American people